Kreuzfahrt ins Glück is a German television series.

Das Traumschiff is a spin-off that follows two wedding planners and the couple that hired them. They are all traveling on a German cruise ship where the couple is about to get married and spend their honeymoon visiting places, where they dock.

See also
List of German television series

References

External links
 

2006 German television series debuts
2010s German television series
ZDF original programming
Television series set on cruise ships
German-language television shows